Vernon Jack Pachal (born November 4, 1930) is a Canadian former ice hockey player. He played from 1956 to 1958 at the University of Alberta, where he set a points record for the Canada West University Athletics Association. He then played in the Eastern Hockey League, American Hockey League, Quebec Hockey League, and Saskatchewan Senior Hockey League before his retirement in the 1960s. He also played in the Western Canada Junior Hockey League prior to attending the University of Alberta. He is a member of the University of Alberta's Sports Wall of Fame (inducted 1999) and Saskatchewan Sports Hall of Fame (inducted 2013).

References

External links

1930 births
Living people
Alberta Golden Bears ice hockey players
Canadian ice hockey centres
Ice hockey people from Saskatchewan
Sportspeople from Yorkton